This is a list of people who are widely recognised in the fields of both sport and the visual arts:

See also
Art of the Olympians

References

26. Blake McFarland https://www.blakemcfarland.com/

Art
Sport